The Contenders is a 14-program series that was produced and aired by C-SPAN in the fall of 2011. It looked at the lives and careers of 14 candidates for the presidency of the United States who were determined to have made significant impacts on U.S. politics despite not having won the presidency. Most episodes were broadcast from a location of significance to the person being profiled, and featured interviews and discussion with a variety of experts.

Selection of subjects
The list of persons profiled was selected by C-SPAN producer Mark Farkas and historian Richard Norton Smith, who was a consultant to the series.  Smith described the objective of their efforts as follows:

To give viewers an alternative school of American political history, in particular. It has famously been observed that the winners write the history books, and there's a lot of truth to that. But that means that we are deprived of... It's like the dark side of the moon. There's another whole story line... and even more, on the biographical level, there are 14 people in this series, many of whom I guarantee viewers may never have heard of. And all of whom I can pretty much guarantee they will find interesting to fascinating, and certainly surprising.

Programs

See also
They Also Ran

References

External links

 

C-SPAN original programming
2011 American television series debuts
2011 American television series endings
2010s American television talk shows
Candidates for President of the United States
Presidential elections in the United States